Temple Church, also known as Holy Cross Church, is a ruined church in Redcliffe, Bristol, England. It is on the site of a previous, round church of the Knights Templar, which they built on land granted to them in the second quarter of the 12th century by Robert of Gloucester. In 1313 the Knights Hospitaller acquired the church, following the suppression of the Templars, only to lose it in 1540 at the time of the Dissolution of the Monasteries. By the early 14th century, the church served as the parish church for the area known as Temple Fee. From around the same time, the rebuilding of the church on a rectangular plan started. This was completed by 1460, with the construction of a leaning west tower.

The church was the scene of the exorcism of George Lukins conducted by Methodist and Anglican clergy in 1788.

The church was bombed and largely destroyed in the Bristol Blitz. It is a Grade II* listed building, owned by the Diocese of Bristol. In 1958, English Heritage agreed to undertake a guardianship role. A 1960 excavation by the Ministry of Works discovered the plan of the 12th-century church, enabling it to be marked out on the ground in stone.

Early history

The 12th-century church was a Templar preceptory, built on land granted to the Templars by Robert, Earl of Gloucester, sometime in the two decades before his death in 1147.

The Knights Hospitaller acquired the church in 1313, following the suppression of the Templars. The Hospitallers lost their English properties to the Crown in 1540, and in 1544 the church was acquired by Bristol Corporation.

The parish of Temple Fee had come into being by 1308, the first year in which the church was recorded as having a vicar. Temple Fee and Redcliffe Fee were distinct parishes, physically separated by a "Law Ditch". Both were absorbed into Bristol by the city charter of 1373, ending a dispute between Bristol and Somerset over jurisdiction. Temple parish merged into St Mary Redcliffe parish in 1956.

World War II bombing
The church was bombed on 24/25 November 1940 in the Bristol Blitz, leaving it an empty shell. The damage was severe and although the arcades still stood they were very unsafe and have since been removed. The wrought-iron parclose screens to the side chapels did survive and are today in the Lord Mayor's Chapel. The sword rest by William Edney is now preserved but broken up into sections and re-erected in other churches. The 15th century candelabrum, with its central statue of the Virgin Mary also survived, albeit a little dented, and now hangs in the Berkeley Chapel of Bristol Cathedral. Temple Church also contained a peal of 8 bells, which were moved to the Cathedral's north-west tower after the bombing.

The bombing destroyed the stores of records kept in the cellars.

Listed status

It was the first English parish church to be taken into ownership by the then Ministry of Works, and is today in the care of English Heritage. It is protected by two heritage listings, as a Grade II* listed building, and as a scheduled monument.

The archway and gates, which date from the mid 19th century and made from Portland stone and wrought iron in a Gothic Revival style, are listed separately from the church as Grade II.

From 2021 to 2023 the site received significant restoration work by English Heritage in a conservation project costing about £1 million. This allowed the first public access for more than thirty years.

Architecture

The 12th-century church had a round nave, with an aisle arcade, and a chancel with a semicircular apse. This chancel was replaced with a rectangular one, with a chapel added to its north side in Decorated style, in the late 13th or early 14th century. A second chapel was built later in the 14th century, on the south side, to which Perpendicular windows were added in the 15th century. These chapels have been identified respectively as St Katherine's Chapel, granted to the Bristol company of weavers by Edward I in 1299, and a chantry licensed to John Frauceys the younger by Edward III in 1331. Cloth weaving was the staple industry of Bristol in the late Middle Ages, and its centre was in Temple parish.

The round nave was replaced with a rectangular, aisled nave, in early Perpendicular style, completed around the last decade of the 14th century. The nave arcade was extended into the choir of the chancel.

A free-standing bell tower seems to have existed until the early 15th century, further to the west. The present, leaning west tower was built in stages, and completed between 1441 and 1460. The highest stage is at a different angle to the vertical to the lower stages, as the masons attempted to correct for the subsidence of the lower stages. The top of the tower leans  from the vertical. The lean is popularly attributed to the foundations of the tower being built on top of wool-sacks but is most likely due to the soft alluvial clay underneath being compressed.

Archives
Parish records for Temple Church, Bristol are held at Bristol Archives (Ref. P.Tem) (online catalogue) including baptism, marriage, burial and burial in woollen registers. The archive also includes records of the churchwardens, charities and vestry.  The archive of records for Temple Church is fragmented because the records were kept within the church when it was bombed.

Performance events

From 29 October to 21 November 2015, the church hosted Sanctum, a performance event created by the American installation artist Theaster Gates together with the art group Situations, as part of Bristol 2015 European Green Capital. A temporary, steepled auditorium was built inside the church, using salvaged historic materials from elsewhere in Bristol, designed to amplify the sounds of musical and other performances taking place 24 hours a day for 24 days.

The site participated in the 2023 Bristol Light Festival, celebrating its opening on 3 February following a restoration project.

See also
 Grade II* listed buildings in Bristol
 Churches in Bristol

References

Further reading
The cathedral church of Bristol, Henri Jean Louis; Joseph Massé

External links

Temple Church information from English Heritage

Temple Church
Temple Church
Temple Church
Ruins of churches destroyed during World War II
Temple Church
Temple Church
Temple Church
12th-century church buildings in England
Inclined towers
Churches completed in 1460
Towers completed in the 15th century
Church ruins in England
Temple Church
Grade II* listed ruins